Agostino Lamma (1636–1700) was an Italian painter, active in Venice and specializing in battle paintings. He was trained under Antonio Calza, and his Siege of Vienna by the Turks, painted in the style of Mattias Stom. He died in Venice.

References

1636 births
1700 deaths
17th-century Italian painters
Italian male painters
Painters from Venice
Italian Baroque painters
Italian battle painters